Anthony "AJ" Marcucci Jr. (born August 31, 1999) is an American soccer player who currently plays as a goalkeeper for MLS side New York Red Bulls.

Career

Youth
Marcucci played at the Episcopal Academy through high school.  Marcucci played as part of the Penn Fusion academy until 2017.

College & Amateur
In 2017, Marcucci attended Connecticut College to play college soccer. With the Camels, Marcucci appeared in 54 of the team's 55 matches between 2017 and 2019, with the 2020 season been cancelled due to the COVID-19 pandemic. Marcucci finished his career with a school-record 25 career shutouts to go along with an .887 save percentage, and an 0.50 goals against average.

Marcucci earned a place on the NCAA All-America First Team as the nation's top Division III goalkeeper twice by both the United Soccer Coaches and D3soccer.com in 2018 and 2019. Marcucci was also named the NESCAC Rookie of the Year in 2017 and the NESCAC Player of the Year in 2018.

While at college, Marcucci also appeared for NPSL side West Chester United during their 2019 season. He was set to play with the team during their 2020 season in the USL League Two, but the season was eventually cancelled.

Professional
On January 21, 2021, Marcucci was selected 67th overall in the 2021 MLS SuperDraft by New York Red Bulls. He became the first ever draft pick from Connecticut College and was the first Division III pick since 2016.

On April 15, 2021, Marcucci signed with New York's USL Championship side New York Red Bulls II. He made his debut on May 14, 2021, starting in a 1–0 loss to the Miami FC. On May 18, 2021, Marcucci recorded his first win with New York in a 2-1 victory over Loudoun United.

On September 11, 2021, Marcucci moved to the New York Red Bulls first team roster in MLS.

References

External links

1999 births
Living people
American soccer players
Association football goalkeepers
National Premier Soccer League players
New York Red Bulls draft picks
New York Red Bulls players
New York Red Bulls II players
People from West Chester, Pennsylvania
Soccer players from Pennsylvania
USL Championship players
Sportspeople from Chester County, Pennsylvania
Connecticut College Camels men's soccer players
Connecticut College alumni